Polaris (Polaris Entertainment), previously known as Ilgwang Polaris, is a South Korean record label founded in 2006. It was formerly a subsidiary of Ilgwang Group, a large South Korean conglomerate whose main business is arms trade, and is now a subsidiary of Levite United, founded by CEO and Ilgwang Group founder Lee Kyu-tae's son Lee Jong-myung.

Artists

Groups

Tripleme

Soloists 

 Han Hee-jun

Actors and actresses 

 Jung Ho Bin
 Kim Bo Jung
 Lee Ji An
 Nam So Ok
 Oh Yoon Ah
 Lee Woo Jong
 Choi Si Hun
 Choi Jae Won
 Kim Kang Jin
 Yoo Hyun Seok

Former Artists 

 Ivy
 Rumble Fish+
 Kim Wan-sun

Clara Lee (2006–2014)
 Choi Moo-sung
 Jae Hee
 Jeong Ho-bin
 Ji Dae-han

 Jung Jae-eun
 Jung Joon
 Lee Eun-woo
 Lee Kyun
 Kim Joon-bae
 Kim Se-ah
 Kim Tae-han
 Oh Yoon-ah
 Park Jung-chul
 Ryu Hwa-young 
 Shin Min-cheol
 Sunwoo Jae-duk
 Yang Dong-geun

 Kim Tae-woo (2006–2011)
 Chae Dong-ha (2007–2011)
 Dia (2010–2012)
 Hwang Ji-hyun (???–2012)
 Ladies' Code (2013–2020)
 Iron (2015)
 Kim Bum-soo (2008–2018)
Sunye (2018–2022)

Notes

References

External links
 
 Parent company's profile

South Korean record labels
Record labels established in 2006
2006 establishments in South Korea
Entertainment companies established in 2006
Talent agencies of South Korea
Companies based in Seoul
Labels distributed by CJ E&M Music and Live
Labels distributed by Kakao M